Brevicornu foliatum is a Palearctic species of  'fungus gnat' in the family Mycetophilidae. Members of this genus are found in a wider variety of habitats from wooded streams to wetlands and open moorland.  
Larvae develop in dead wood and in soil litter, feeding probably on microfungi.

References

External links
 Images representing  Brevicornu at BOLD

Mycetophilidae
Insects described in 1925
Nematoceran flies of Europe